The Food Craft Institute was established in Balangir, western Orissa, India. This institute runs under the department of tourism, government of India. It has been offering hospitality education and caters particularly to students of western Orissa.It is reported that the Indian Government will upgrade this institute to an institute of hotel management.

References

External links
State Institute of Hotel Management

Hospitality schools in India
Education in Odisha
Balangir
Educational institutions in India with year of establishment missing